Khorramabad (also Romanized as Khorramābād) is a village in Nurabad Rural District, Garkan-e Jonubi District, Mobarakeh County, Isfahan Province, Iran. At the 2006 census, its population was 64, in 13 families.

References 

Populated places in Mobarakeh County